Tourism in Nunavut focuses on outdoor activities and culture of the local Inuit, the indigenous people of Nunavut. Wildlife watching is a popular tourist attraction, as the territory is home to a number of wildlife and bird sanctuaries. It is possible to spot walrus, polar bears, a large variety of birds and belugas throughout Nunavut. Outdoor adventure activities are also popular. Nunavut has a wide and lengthy river system, meaning that there are a large number of canoeing and kayaking opportunities to suit experienced travellers. Nunavut's vast expanse of uninhabited territory offers many opportunities for hiking and camping. However, the region's often extreme conditions and remote location often necessitates a guide, even for experienced campers.

Nunavut Tourism does not regularly publish tourism statistics. However, an exit survey conducted by the Department of Economic Development and Transportation between June and October 2008 revealed that 33,378 people visited Nunavut during that period, up from 28,802 in June–October 2006. The vast majority of visitors to Nunavut are Canadian, with 96% of travellers arriving from Canada. However, the leisure travel market is not as dominated by Canadian visitors, with 28% of foreign visitors.

Attractions 

Nunavut features a number of outdoor adventure activity opportunities as a result of the territory's vast uninhabited area. Wildlife watching is one particularly popular activity - the territory is home to walrus and belugas, as well as eleven bird sanctuaries housing millions of birds. Muskox are also spread throughout Nunavut, although the territory's tourism authority does not promote 'muskox watching' trips specifically. The territory is also home to a population of polar bears, and trips designed to increase tourists' chances of spotting a polar bear are common. A number of private operators offer wildlife, bird, polar and whale watching tours, in addition to other activities.

Other popular activities for tourists in Nunavut involve the Canadian territory's vast opportunities for adventuring. Canoeing and kayaking are possible on the territory's lengthy rivers, with the Thelon River being the most famous of these. This river is most popular during summer - despite not having road access direct to the river, many visitors participate in kayaking or canoeing along the river each year, as it is not as difficult to navigate as some of the other rivers in Nunavut. Another popular outdoor adventure activity is hiking. Nunavut Tourism promotes Nunavut as having a number of short and long hikes available to tourists, with camping possible in the middle of "caribou birthing grounds... [and at Whale Cove,] at the river, teeming with chirping white whales." However, due to Nunavut's rugged terrain and often extreme conditions, Nunavut Tourism recommends the use of a guide for all campers and hikers staying the night outdoors to enhance safety.

One tourism activity unique to the Arctic North is iceberg watching. During the summer season of April to July, it is possible to watch icebergs moving down rivers while the ice around them melts. In addition, watching the floe edge is also a popular activity due to wildlife movement during this time. Whales can often be seen swimming metres from the ice, polar bears can be observed swimming briefly in the icy water and amphibious animals often bring themselves up onto dry land or onto the ice to sunbathe.

Statistics 

Nunavut Tourism did not, as of 2002, produce detailed statistics about tourism numbers, trends and characteristics. However, by 2010, this appeared to have changed, with Nunavut Tourism providing media outlets with general figures on trends in tourism in Nunavut. Tourism brings approximately CAD $30 million to Nunavut's economy each year according to Nunavut Tourism, with one in five of its tourists arriving on cruise ships. Between June and October 2008, 33,378 people visited Nunavut by air and sea, according to the territory's Department of Economic Development and Transportation. This is an almost 16 percent increase on the number of people who visited Nunavut by air and sea during the same period in 2006, which was 28,802 people. The average age of people arriving in Nunavut was 46 during the period in 2008 that the Department of Economic Development and Transportation conducted its survey, and the majority of visitors were in the territory for business purposes. 96 percent of all business travellers entering the territory were domestic travellers (Canadian residents). However, among the leisure traveller sub-group, the proportion of domestic travellers declines - Canadians make up only 72 percent of the leisure traveller arrival numbers, with travellers from the United States (20 percent) and other countries (8 percent) making up the difference. September and July account for 46 percent of arrivals, making them the busiest arrival months.

The most popular tourist destination among arrivals to Nunavut was Qikiqtaaluk (Baffin Island), home to the territory's capital, Iqaluit. Visitors to Baffin Island comprised 63 percent of all travellers to Nunavut. 11 percent visited the Kivalliq Region, seven percent travelled to the Kitikmeot Region and the remainder were cruise ship passengers who visited a number of Nunavut towns during their journeys. 76 percent of visitors to the Kivalliq Region travelled for business, leisure tourism was the most popular reason given for travel to the Kitikmeot Region, and visiting friends and family was the most popular reason given for travel to Baffin Island. 21 cruise ships visited Nunavut communities in 2009.

Market issues 
In the 2002 Nunavut Tourism publication The Time is Right: A Vision and Strategy for Tourism Development in Nunavut, a number of issues facing Nunavut tourism operators were highlighted. One major issue for the Nunavut tourism industry is the territory's remote nature. This imposes high travel costs on visitors to Nunavut, and drives tourism numbers down. In addition, Nunavut's position north of the Arctic Circle reduces the opportunity for spring activities, and results in a highly seasonally based tourism market. This limits opportunities for year-round employment in the territory. Many tourism organisations and operators faced difficulty attracting high-quality staff members to their ranks, and experienced high levels of turnover. There are limited links between tourism operators, inhibiting opportunities for inter-sector growth.

A number of governmental and human resource issues also exist. Employees in the tourism industry are often poorly trained and tourism operators also face high staff turnover. A lack of interest in tourism development also exists in many Nunavut governmental organisations as well as in the private sector, and a policy put in place to prevent "market disruption" by new businesses has led to many businesses being denied licences to operate due to the new competition they would bring to the market. This policy has not only acted to the detriment of competition in the tourism sector but has also limited the opportunities for industry growth. Finally, a lack of in-depth and relevant statistics about trends and growth in tourism in Nunavut has prevented businesses from planning for their short- and long-term futures.

References

External links 

 Website of the Nunavut Tourism Association